Salvia (born 2000/2001) is a Welsh drag artist, performance artist, designer, and FX artist. Based in Cyffylliog, Denbighshire, She first garnered attention from fashion names such as Rick Owens and Vogue For her outlandish and alien like looks and Instagram posts. She collaborated with Rick Owens for his autumn/winter 2019 collection runway, working on prosthetics and makeup for the models. She often closely works with other artists such as Jazmin Bean and Parma Ham, creating performance art videos and art installations, however her main platform is Instagram, which she uses to showcase her work and drag looks.

Early life 

Growing up in a small village in North Wales, Salvia accounts being bullied at a young age, and finding solace and inspiration from artists such as Leigh Bowery, Lady Gaga, and fashion designer Alexander McQueen. Around the age of 13, she began creating drawings and paintings inspired by sci fi and futuristic visuals, eventually moving on to using those visuals in her makeup and drag looks.

Artistry 

Salvia’s work covers numerous mediums, such as photography, design, directing, graphic design, FX work, makeup artistry, styling, and film making. Photographer Rick Castro described her as "an influencer, a fashion icon, a beauty icon, a goth diva, the illuminati, and a Satanist." Her focus is creating edited photography of her fashion and makeup design, and she often struggles with her work being censored on online platforms due to her extremity. Her main outcome with her work is to present alien and horror influenced visuals, through muted colour palettes, medical prosthetics, and often uncomfortable displays of humanity and biology. Salvia released a single in 2020 named "The Man who watches me sleep", an ambient pop, darkcore song, which she has stated is inspired by her childhood. She uses sounds incorporated with horror in the song, using "frightful" sound to evoke fear in the listener.

Nullo 

Collaborating with artist Parma Ham, Salvia created Nullo, an inaugural runway show featuring fetishwear, fashion design, and performance art. The show was created to "Redesign fetishwear and bodily augmentation for today’s posthuman tribes". Their aim with Nullo is to critique binaries, explore sexuality, and find new ways of experiencing the limits of the body.

Rick Owens Autumn/Winter 2019 

For the runway show of his Autumn/Winter 2019 show, fashion designer Rick Owens enlisted Salvia’s help to transfer her otherworldly visuals to the models in the show, creating makeup inspired by and assisted by her, Salvia stating "Rick felt like my aesthetic would be very appropriate for his show; it was exciting to see my makeup brought to life on multiple models"

The following year, Owens was criticized on social media by Salvia, for "borrowing heavily from the aesthetic of the teen" in his Spring/Summer 2020 show, in which Salvia was "not consulted or paid for her likeness in the show".

Personal life 

Salvia identifies as a trans woman, and has stated "negative and immature reactions" to her work "are just one of the many signs of the ignorance and trans-misogyny that is still vastly present in society".

In 2023 she has voiced thoughts of detransitioning, stating "I started feeling like I didn't identify with being a trans woman anymore around 2 years ago" and that she was "born to serve feminine cunt" but as a boy, though added "maybe that will change one day." She also stated she is fine with any pronouns.

She is dating Damien Smiler.

Discography 

|"Tera Toma"
|2021
|Tera Toma
|}

References 

Welsh fashion designers
People from Denbighshire
Transgender artists
Transgender women
LGBT fashion designers
Year of birth missing (living people)
Living people